Luis Osorio (died 1496) was a Roman Catholic prelate who served as Bishop of Jaén (1483–1496).

Biography
In 1483, Luis Osorio was appointed during the papacy of Pope Sixtus IV as Bishop of Jaén. He served as Bishop of Jaén until his death in 1496.

References

External links and additional sources
 (for Chronology of Bishops) 
 (for Chronology of Bishops) 

15th-century Roman Catholic bishops in Castile
Bishops appointed by Pope Sixtus IV
1496 deaths